Lacuna pallidula, common name the pale lacuna, is a species of sea snail, a marine gastropod mollusk in the family Littorinidae, the winkles or periwinkles.

Description 
The maximum recorded shell length is 10 mm.

Habitat 
Minimum recorded depth is 0 m. Maximum recorded depth is 70 m.

References

Littorinidae
Gastropods described in 1778
Taxa named by Emanuel Mendes da Costa